Yohann Malory better known as Malory (born 10 January 1985) is a French singer, songwriter and composer.

Biography
Yohann Malory was born in Madagascar and brought up between Madagascar and Thailand. He immigrated to France in 1994 when he was nine. Influenced by hip hop, he started music in 1998 at 13 years old in the collective Récidiviste, and then formed his own group Phenom-n with Sir Kenny, Loey et Lyess.

Spotted by Universal, he published, in 2012, an E.P. carried by the single Entre toi et moi directed by Pierrick Devin (Phoenix, Fortune, Adam Kesher). He collaborates with Brigitte Fontaine on the title Chien de lune, Benjamin Lebeau and William Brière of the group The Shoes on the title Kiss Kiss Bang Bang. He puts to music the text of Frédéric Beigbeder Bribes d'arrestation.

Discography

Albums

EPs

References

1985 births
Living people
21st-century French male singers
21st-century Malagasy male singers
French rappers
Malagasy emigrants to France